The sport of football in the country of Guinea-Bissau is run by the Football Federation of Guinea-Bissau. The association administers the national football team, as well as the national league. Association football (soccer) is the most popular sport in the country. Since the Portuguese navigator Nuno Tristão reached the local coast in 1446, but at the latest since the official foundation of the colony Bissau in 1753, the country was a Portuguese colony, and became officially independent only in 1975. To this day, football in Guinea-Bissau is therefore characterized by its Portuguese origins and relationships, for example through a number of affiliates of the Portuguese clubs Sporting Lisbon and Benfica Lisbon. Also, many Guinea-Bissau footballers play in Portugal.

Domestic football

Since 1975 the FFGB organizes the national championship, the Campeonato Nacional da Guiné-Bissau. Record champion is with 13 titles founded in 1936 Sporting Clube de Bissau, the 89th affiliate of the Portuguese club Sporting Lisbon. In 2014, the title went to the first Nuno Tristão FC from Bula in the Cacheu region.

The national trophy of the FFGB, the Taça Nacional da Guiné-Bissau has been played since 1977. The first winner was União Desportiva Internacional from Bissau, who won the cup six times (as of December 2014). The club is thus record winner of the cup competition, on par with Sport Bissau e Benfica, a subsidiary of the Portuguese club Benfica Lisbon. In 2014 won the second-class Futebol Clube de Canchungo from Canchungo surprisingly. In the following Supertaça, the Supercup against champions Nuno Tristão FC, the club was defeated on 27 December 2014 only on penalties with 2: 3.

So far, no club from Guinea Bissau for the CAF Champions League or the CAF Confederation Cup could qualify.

League system

National team

The Guinea-Bissau national football team has been participating in FIFA tournaments since 1986. So far, she could qualify neither for a World Cup nor for the African Nations Championships. 2017 succeeded for the first time the qualification for the African Cup of Nations.

Guinea-Bissau participated several times in the West African Amílcar Cabral Cup, hosting it himself in 1979, 1988 and 2007. The tournament could not win the national team Bissau so far. So far, the selection of the country always participates in the football competitions in the Jogos da Lusofonia, and continues to pursue its first title there.

In December 2014, Guinea-Bissau finished 133rd in the FIFA World Ranking. His highest FIFA placing reached the selection in July 1994 with the 115th place, the worst in February 2010 with the 195th place.

Since 2017, Baciro Candé has coached the national team of Guinea-Bissau.

Women's football

The women's Guinea-Bissau national football team has been on two occasions for qualifying for the Women's Africa Cup of Nations in 2002 and 2014, but the FFGB withdrew both times.

Guinea-Bissau stadiums

References